Hanshan is a district of the city of Handan, Hebei, People's Republic of China.

Administrative divisions
Hanshan administers 10 subdistricts, 2 towns, and 1 township.

Subdistricts: 
Huomo Subdistrict, Lingyuan Road Subdistrict, Guangming Road Subdistrict, Fudong Subdistrict, Luochengtou Subdistrict, Zhuhe Road Subdistrict, Yuxinnan Subdistrict, Nonglin Road Subdistrict, Maodong Subdistrict, Maoxi Subdistrict

Towns: 
Matou, Beizhangzhuang

The only township is Mazhuang Township

References

External links

County-level divisions of Hebei
Handan